Valeska dos Santos Menezes (born 23 April 1976 in Niteroi; nicknamed Valeskinha) is a volleyball player from Brazil.

She represented her native country at the 1999 FIVB Volleyball Women's World Cup, and 2004 Summer Olympics in Athens, Greece. She was named "Best Blocker" at the 2003 FIVB Women's World Cup in Japan, where the Brazilian national team claimed the silver medal.

Awards

Individuals
 2002 FIVB World Grand Prix – "Best Blocker"
 2003 FIVB World Cup – "Best Blocker"
 2003–04 Brazilian Superliga – "Best Blocker"
 2004–05 Brazilian Superliga – "Best Blocker"
 2005 South American Championship – "Most Valuable Player"
 2005–06 Brazilian Superliga – "Best Blocker"

References

FIVB profile

1976 births
Living people
Brazilian women's volleyball players
Volleyball players at the 2004 Summer Olympics
Volleyball players at the 2008 Summer Olympics
Olympic volleyball players of Brazil
Olympic gold medalists for Brazil
Sportspeople from Niterói
Karşıyaka volleyballers
Galatasaray S.K. (women's volleyball) players
Olympic medalists in volleyball
Medalists at the 2008 Summer Olympics
Middle blockers
Expatriate volleyball players in Italy
Expatriate volleyball players in Turkey
Brazilian expatriate sportspeople in Turkey
Brazilian expatriates in Italy
20th-century Brazilian women
21st-century Brazilian women